Bulbophyllum salaccense is a species of orchid in the genus Bulbophyllum. It was formerly known as Cochlia violacea, the sole species in the monotypic genus Cochlia.

References
The Bulbophyllum-Checklist
The Internet Orchid Species Photo Encyclopedia

salaccense